The third season of So You Think You Can Dance, a televised Dutch-Belgian dance competition show, based on an American show by the same name, premiered on August 29, 2010. Dan Karaty, Jan Kooijman, and Euvgenia Parakhina reprised their roles on the judging roles with newcomer Marco Gerris joining the panel as well. Dennis Weening and An Lemmens continued to co-host the program.

Hip-hop dancer Floris Bosveld was announced winner on the November 28 finale and won €25,000, a choice of dance school scholarships in the (U.S.) and a role in Dutch dance film Body Language by Johan Nijenhuis.

Selection Process

Auditions 
As with the second season, initial open auditions were held in Antwerp over two days, with excerpts shown as the first four episodes on the season.

Bootcamp
111 dancers were accepted beyond the first round and attended a workshop at the ArtEz complex in Arnhem. During the first day, hopefuls were separated into four groups to study four different styles (hip-hop, lyrical hip-hop, modern, and jazz) and then tested on their acquisition of the styles, with 60 competitors cut after this first round. The remaining contestants were then tested on the second day in a cha-cha round run by choreographers Roemjana de Haan and Koen Brouwers.

On the third day of the Bootcamp process, the judges announced that this season's foreign component to the process would be held in Moscow, Russia but that only 24 dancers would proceed to this point.  Each judge picked one dancer to advance to this point of the process automatically and the remaining dancers were required to perform solos for one of the remaining 20 spots. Arriving in Russia, the remaining 24 dancers learned that the last Bootcamp round would feature ballet training.  After observing the dancer perform a classical pas de deux from Swan Lake the judges made their final selections for the season's Top 18 dancers.

Live Shows

Top 18

Male Contestants

Female Contestants

Elimination Chart

Performance

Live Show 1 (October 10, 2010)

Results Show 1
Group Choreography: Top 18: "Animale"—Don Diablo feat. Dragonette (Hip-hop; Choreography: Roy Julen)
Dance For Your Life solos:

Nieuw Couple:
 Junes Lazaar & Evelyne De Weerdt

Live Show 2 (October 17, 2010)

Results Show 2
Group Choreography: Top 16: "Bad Romance"—Lady Gaga (Pop; Choreography: Cora Ringelberg)
Dance For Your Life solos:

Nieuw Couple:
 Junes Lazaar & Agar Dedeene Y Comez

Live Show 3 (October 24, 2010)

Results Show 3
Group Choreography: Top 14: "Storm"—Vanessa-Mae (Modern, Choreography: Ed Wubbe)
Dance For Your Life solos:

Nieuw Couple:
 Cagdas "Caggie" Gulum & Agar Dedeene Y Comez

Live Show 4 (October 31, 2010)

Results Show 4
Group Choreography: Top 12: "Dynamite"—Taio Cruz (Hip Hop, Choreography: Roy Julen)
Dance For Your Life solos:

Live Show 5 (November 7, 2010)

Results Show 5
Group Choreography: Top 10: "Push Push" en "Party O'Clock"—Kat DeLuna (Hip Hop, Choreography: Roy Julen)
Solos:

Live Show 6 (November 14, 2010)

Results Show 6
Group Choreography: Top 8: "Slow Me Down"—Emmy Rossum (Hip Hop; Choreography: Roy Julen)
Solos:

Live Show 7 (November 21, 2010)

Results Show 7
Group Choreography: Top 6: (Flamenco; Choreography: Bettina Castaño)
Eliminated
 Enora Oplinus
 Stefano Giuliani

Finale (November 28, 2010) 

Judge Jan Koooijman, having once said that he would himself dance on the stage if the series ever garnered a million votes for a single show decided to perform instead for the finale of season 3 for the landmark of a million viewers, which occurred earlier in the season. dancing a duet with season 2 winner Smekens Els  to modern choreography by Ed Wubbe.  The finale also featured the announcement that series had been picked up for a fourth season.

Results Show Finale
Group Choreography: Top 18: "Ridin' Solo"—Jason Derülo (Hip-hop; Choreography: Roy Julen)
Gastdansers: Jan Kooijman & Els Smekens: "Creep"—Radiohead (Modern, Choreography: Ed Wubbe)
Eliminated
Natascha Dejong
Solos:

Battle:

Runner-up
Lorenzo van Velzen Bottazzi
Winner:
Floris Bosveld

Theatre Tour

External links 
 Official website, vtm (Belgium)
 Official website, RTL (Netherlands)

References

Season 03